Anne Line Gjersem (born 6 January 1994) is a Norwegian retired figure skater. She is the 2015 Nordic silver medalist, the 2015 Denkova-Staviski Cup bronze medalist, and a three-time Norwegian national champion. She represented Norway at the 2014 Winter Olympics and has reached the free skate at six ISU Championships.

Personal life 
Anne Line Gjersem was born together with a twin sister, Camilla, on 6 January 1994 in Hønefoss, Norway. Their mother, Perlina Bangug, is a Filipina from Ilagan, Isabela, and their father, Petter Gjersem, a Norwegian from Raufoss. Anne Line is studying information and communication technologies at Lund University.

Career 
Gjersem began skating at the age of eight in Gjøvik. She debuted on the ISU Junior Grand Prix series in 2008. She appeared three times at the World Junior Championships — her best result was 26th in 2010.

Gjersem made her senior ISU Championship debut at the 2011 European Championships and finished 25th. In October 2012, she ruptured a groin muscle, causing her to withdraw from the Warsaw Cup. In 2013, she qualified for her second European Championships, where she finished 22nd, and for her first World Championships, where she placed 32nd.

2013–14 season: Sochi Olympics
The Nebelhorn Trophy in September 2013 was the final qualifying opportunity for countries which had not already earned a spot in a figure skating event at the 2014 Winter Olympics. By placing seventh, Gjersem earned a ladies' entry for Norway. In October 2013, she sustained a thigh injury at the International Cup of Nice. In January 2014, she came in 19th at the 2014 European Championships in Budapest.

In February 2014, Gjersem competed in the Winter Olympics in Sochi, Russia, becoming the first Norwegian Olympian in figure skating since 1964. With a placement of 24th in the short program, she qualified for the free skate, where she placed 22nd, and finished 23rd overall. In March, she advanced to the free skate at the 2014 World Championships in Saitama, Japan and finished 22nd.

2014–15 season 
In 2014–15, Gjersem competed at her first senior Grand Prix assignments, placing 11th at 2014 Cup of China and 12th at 2014 NHK Trophy. In January she became the Norwegian national champion, after placing 2nd in the short program behind her twin sister. Gjersem won the silver medal at the 2015 Nordic Championships. She placed 17th at the 2015 World Championships, the best result for a Norwegian ladies' skater since the 1940s.

2015–16 season 
Gjersem started the 2015–16 season by placing 8th at the 2015 Finlandia Trophy. She won the bronze medal at the 2015 Denkova-Staviski Cup with a new personal best score. She became the Norwegian national champion for the 4th time, again finishing ahead of her twin sister. At the 2016 European Championships Gjersem placed 14th in the short program, and 17th in the free program and overall.

2016–17 season
Gjersem sustained a shoulder injury in May 2016 and a knee injury in the autumn. She returned to competition in January 2017 at the EDU Sport Trophy in Romania, where she was the only senior skater. She did not compete at the 2017 Norwegian Championships, but placed 10th at the 2017 Toruń Cup the same weekend. She placed 24th at the 2017 Europeans in Ostrava, and 34th at the 2017 Worlds in Helsinki.

Programs

Competitive highlights 
GP: Grand Prix; CS: Challenger Series; JGP: Junior Grand Prix

References

External links

Navigation 

1994 births
Living people
Figure skaters at the 2014 Winter Olympics
Norwegian female single skaters
Norwegian people of Filipino descent
Olympic figure skaters of Norway
People from Ringerike (municipality)
Norwegian twins
Twin sportspeople
Competitors at the 2015 Winter Universiade
Sportspeople from Viken (county)
21st-century Norwegian women